"The World" is a song by British musician Angel. It was first released in the United Kingdom on 5 April 2013 as the fourth single from his debut studio album About Time (2013). The song peaked at number 73 on the UK Singles Chart.

Music video
A music video to accompany the release of "The World" was first released onto YouTube on 7 February 2013 at a total length of three minutes and fifty-four seconds.

The music video starts off in the future( 25 March 2063 ), a grandma is passing away, her family surrounding her. She looks up and sees someone in the room, no one else can see this person. He puts out his hand and she takes it which takes her into a travel through her life and becomes young again. Then we find out that her and Angel once were lovers and we go through all these moments of her life until Angel died. After Angel's death, we can see that the young women is devastated while Angel ( as an angel) watches over her.

Track listing

Chart performance

Weekly charts

Release history

References

Angel (British musician) songs
2013 singles
2012 songs
Songs written by Parker Ighile